Lothar Stäber (born 4 May 1936) is a former German cyclist who competed for the SC Dynamo Berlin / Sportvereinigung (SV) Dynamo. He won many titles during his career.

He competed in the tandem event at the 1960 Summer Olympics where he won a silver medal.

References

External links
 
 

1936 births
Living people
German male cyclists
German track cyclists
Olympic cyclists of the United Team of Germany
Olympic silver medalists for the United Team of Germany
Sportspeople from Erfurt
Cyclists at the 1960 Summer Olympics
Olympic medalists in cycling
Medalists at the 1960 Summer Olympics
Cyclists from Thuringia
East German male cyclists
People from Bezirk Erfurt
20th-century German people